Depressaria cervicella is a moth of the family Depressariidae. It is found in Spain, Italy, Austria, the Czech Republic, Hungary and Croatia. It is also found in Asia Minor and Iran.

The larvae feed on the flowers and leaves of Trinia glauca. They feed from a spinning (a shelter like the web of a spider).

References

External links
lepiforum.de

Moths described in 1854
Depressaria
Moths of Europe
Moths of Asia